Md. Atiur Rahman Atik is a Bangladesh Awami League politician and the incumbent Member of Parliament from Sherpur-1.

Early life
Atik was born on 1 December 1957. He has a B.A. degree.

Career
Atik was elected to Parliament on 5 January 2014 from Sherpur-1 as a Bangladesh Awami League candidate. On 6 May 2016, Bangladesh Election Commission asked him to remove himself from his own constituency area for violating electoral code of conduct. On 17 April 2018, he was investigated by Bangladesh Anti Corruption Commission after Bangladesh High Court ordered an investigation. He is a whip of the parliament.

References

1957 births
Living people
People from Sherpur District
Awami League politicians
7th Jatiya Sangsad members
8th Jatiya Sangsad members
9th Jatiya Sangsad members
10th Jatiya Sangsad members
11th Jatiya Sangsad members